Abbas Zuberi Mtemvu (born 1 November 1959) is a Tanzanian CCM politician and Member of Parliament for Temeke constituency since 2005.

References

1959 births
Living people
Chama Cha Mapinduzi MPs
Tanzanian MPs 2005–2010
Tanzanian MPs 2010–2015
Kibohehe Secondary School alumni